Uma Roy (1919 – 19 December 1999) was an Indian politician belonging to the Indian National Congress. She was elected to the Lok Sabha, lower house of the Parliament of India from Malda in 1967. She was the founder of a higher secondary school at Malda. She established a welfare organisation and provided self-employment to the poor and needy women, as a cooperative organisation in Malda.

References

External links
 Official biographical sketch in Parliament of India website 

1919 births
1999 deaths
Indian National Congress politicians from West Bengal
People from Malda district
India MPs 1967–1970
Women in West Bengal politics
20th-century Indian women politicians
20th-century Indian politicians
Lok Sabha members from West Bengal